Diversidoris flava is a yellow species of sea slug, a dorid nudibranch, a shell-less marine gastropod mollusk in the family Chromodorididae.

Distribution 
This nudibranch was originally described from East Africa, but it has an Indo-West Pacific distribution including Australia (Queensland) and Hawaii.

Description
It has a yellow body with an identifying red mantle margin which has two semi-permanent mantle folds about mid-body. The rhinophores and branchia (gills) are yellow. Identifying individual yellow sea slugs within the genus Diversidoris can be challenging because yellow forms exist in several related species.

Ecology
This species is often found on the yellow sponge Hyrtios, which appears to be its preferred food source.

References

External links
 

Chromodorididae
Gastropods described in 1986